Who U Wit? is a compilation album released from  American hip hop record label No Limit Records. It was released on May 25, 1999 and was produced by Beats By the Pound and Meech Wells. This compilation charted much lower than No Limit's previous two compilations, 1998's Mean Green and We Can't Be Stopped, only making it to #62 on the Billboard 200 and #22 on the Top R&B/Hip-Hop Albums.

Track listing

References

Hip hop compilation albums
Record label compilation albums
Sports compilation albums
1999 compilation albums
No Limit Records compilation albums
Priority Records compilation albums